This list of choreography awards is an index to articles about notable awards given to choreographers for a song, music video or album.

See also
Lists of awards

References

Lists of film awards
Lists of theatre awards